Ondřej Murín (born 15 February 1991) is a former Czech football defender . Murin made his debut in the game against FK Bohemians Praha in the 2009–2010 season.

References

External links

 Guardian Football

1991 births
Living people
Place of birth missing (living people)
Czech footballers
Czech expatriate footballers
Czech First League players
Czech National Football League players
SK Sigma Olomouc players
1. HFK Olomouc players
Slovak Super Liga players
FC Nitra players
Expatriate footballers in Slovakia
Czech expatriate sportspeople in Slovakia
Association football defenders